Patrick Dougherty may refer to:

 Patrick Dougherty (bishop) (1931–2010), Australian Roman Catholic bishop
 Patrick Dougherty (Medal of Honor) (1844–?), American Civil War sailor and Medal of Honor recipient
 Pat Dougherty (born 1948), American politician, Missouri state legislator
 Patsy Dougherty (1876–1940), American baseball player
 Charles Dougherty (baseball) (1879–1939), known as Pat, American baseball player in the pre-Negro leagues
 Patrick Dougherty (artist) (born 1945), American artist and sculptor who works with saplings and other natural materials
 Patrick Dougherty (American football) (born 1985), American football coach

See also
Pat Daugherty (disambiguation)